Kellogg Brown & Root Services, Inc. v. United States ex rel. Carter, 575 U.S. 650 (2015), was a United States Supreme Court involving KBR and a former KRB contractor, Benjamin Carter. In a unanimous opinion written by Associate Justice Samuel Alito, the Court held that Wartime Suspension of Limitations Act only applies to criminal offenses. The Court also held that qui tam lawsuits filed under the False Claims Act are no longer considered "pending" after they have been dismissed.

See also
 List of United States Supreme Court cases
 Lists of United States Supreme Court cases by volume
 List of United States Supreme Court cases by the Roberts Court

References

External links
 

United States Supreme Court cases
United States Supreme Court cases of the Roberts Court
2015 in United States case law